Love Is for Suckers is a 2022 South Korean television series starring Lee Da-hee and Choi Si-won. It aired from October 5 to December 1, 2022, on ENA's Wednesdays and Thursdays at 21:00 (KST) time slot.

Synopsis
The series is about the romance between 20-year-old best friends in their 30s, who unexpectedly meet in a reality dating show as its production director and cast member, and begin experiencing romantic feelings for each other.

Cast

Main
 Lee Da-hee as Goo Yeo-reum, an entertainment production director for ten years who is desperate for work and love.
 Choi Si-won as Park Jae-hoon, a plastic surgeon who has lost interest in both work and love.

Supporting
 Cho Soo-hyang as Kang Chae-ri
 Park Yeon-woo as John Jang
 Lee Joo-yeon as Han Ji-yeon
 Lee Dae-hwi as Kim Sang-woo

Extended
 Im Ha-ryong as Goo Yong-sik
 Yang Hee-kyung as Yoon Young-hee
 Min Jin-woong as Park Dae-sik
 Noh Sussanna as Oh Hye-jin
 Song Jong-ho as Kim In-woo
 Seo Joon as Kim Jun-ho
 Lee Cheol-woo as Lee Hoon-hee
 Kang Seo-joon as Hwang Jang-gun
 Son Hwa-ryeong as Park Ji-wan
 Kim Ji-soo as Jang Tae-mi
 Moon Ye-won as Ahn So-yeon
 Lee Yoo-jin as Geum Su-mi
 Jang Seo-yeon as Park Hyeon-so
 Lee Seok-joon as Ma Jin-guk
 Ahn So-jin as Ga-rim
 Joo Jae-hu as Hee-chang
 Seo Ahn as Ri-eun

Special appearances
 Gabee as herself
 Kwon Yul as Baek Jun-yeol

Viewership

Notes

References

External links
  
 
 
 

Korean-language television shows
ENA television dramas
Television series by Story TV
South Korean romantic comedy television series
2022 South Korean television series debuts
2022 South Korean television series endings